Pierre Evariste Jean-Baptiste Bossier (pronounced Boh Zhay) (March 22, 1797 – April 24, 1844) was a planter, soldier and politician born in Natchitoches, Louisiana. He is the namesake of Bossier Parish (pronounced  ), located east of the Red River across from Shreveport in northwestern Louisiana. Bossier City and the Pierre Bossier Mall shopping center in Bossier City are among the other places named for him.

Early life and education
Born in Natchitoches in 1797, during the period of Spanish rule in Louisiana, Pierre Evariste Jean-Baptiste Bossier was the son of the planter François Paul Bossier and the former Catherine Pélagie Lambre. An ethnic French Catholic Creole, he was privately educated by a tutor in the classics.

Career and death
Bossier was a planter like his father and cultivated cotton and sugar as commodity crops on his plantation, Live Oaks, on the Cane River, depending on the labor of large gangs of enslaved African Americans. This waterway was formerly a segment of the Red River, in Natchitoches Parish. Like other native-born creoles of the planter elite, Bossier served in the state militia, gaining the rank of general.

He entered politics as a Democrat. Bossier was elected as a member of the Louisiana State Senate in 1832, defeating Whig Louis Gustave De Russy. Bossier served from 1833 to 1843.

In the summer of 1839, a political argument between a prominent Whig, General F. Gaiennie, and State Senator General P. E. Bossier, a Democrat, escalated to recriminations published in the local newspaper. Gaiennie, also a general in the state militia, had denounced Bossier as a coward. Bossier demanded a duel and Gaiennie accepted, choosing rifles as the most deadly weapon available. The duel occurred the following autumn on the grounds of Cherokee Plantation, which was owned by Emile Sompayrac in Natchitoches Parish. Gaiennie fired first and missed, Bossier hit Gaiennie in the heart, killing him instantly. Another eleven men died in the aftermath, as animosities related to the duel continued to play out.

Bossier was elected to the U.S. House of Representatives from the newly established Louisiana's 4th congressional district, serving from March 4, 1843, until his death in office a year later on April 24, 1844, in Washington, D.C. before his first term had ended.

Driven by grief over the duel and its fallout, Bossier committed suicide. His coffin was placed in the well of Old Hall of the House and services were conducted by James A. Ryder S.J., then the president of Georgetown University.

Bossier's remains are interred at the Catholic Cemetery in Natchitoches.

Legacy and honors
Bossier City, Bossier Parish, and Pierre Bossier Mall in Bossier City, and Bossier Street in Natchitoches, are all named in his honor.

See also
 List of United States Congress members who died in office (1790–1899)

References

 "Pierre Bossier", A Dictionary of Louisiana Biography, Vol. 1 (1988), p. 92
 Biographical Directory of the United States Congress
 David Colvin, "Bossier's Forgotten Man," Shreveport Times, October 24, 1965

External links
 
 Bossier, Pierre Evariste Jean-Baptiste in Louisiana Historical Association's Dictionary of Louisiana Biography (Scroll down.)
  – Louisiana gravesite
  – cenotaph at the Congressional Cemetery, Washington, DC

1797 births
1844 deaths
Politicians from Natchitoches, Louisiana
American duellists
Democratic Party Louisiana state senators
Bossier Parish, Louisiana
American planters
Democratic Party members of the United States House of Representatives from Louisiana
19th-century American politicians
American slave owners
Catholics from Louisiana